Drnek may refer to:

 Drnek, Czech Republic, a village near Kladno, Czech Republic
 Drnek, Croatia, a village near Orle, Croatia